Pseudorissoina is a genus of sea snails, marine gastropod mollusks in the family Pyramidellidae, the pyrams and their allies.

Species
Species within the genus Pseudorissoina include:
 Pseudorissoina perexiguus (Tate & May, 1900)
 Pseudorissoina tasmanica (Tenison-Woods, 1877)

The following species were brought into synonymy:
 Pseudorissoina minutissima (Tenison Woods, 1878) accepted as Pseudorissoina perexiguus (Tate & May, 1900)

References

External links
 To World Register of Marine Species

Pyramidellidae
Monotypic gastropod genera